Azimi (derived from Azim) is an Arabic and Persian surname. Notable people with the surname include:

 Mojgan Azimi (born 1985), Afghan singer and painter
 Abdul Salam Azimi (born 1936), Afghan jurist

Persian-language surnames
Iranian-language surnames